Tsai Yin Feng (born ) is a Taiwanese female volleyball and beach volleyball player. She was part of the Chinese Taipei women's national volleyball team.

She participated in the 2007 FIVB Volleyball World Grand Prix, and in the 2010 FIVB Volleyball World Grand Prix.

References

External links
 Profile at FIVB.org

1984 births
Living people
Taiwanese women's volleyball players
Place of birth missing (living people)
Taiwanese beach volleyball players
Volleyball players at the 2010 Asian Games
Asian Games competitors for Chinese Taipei